Ungdomens Nykterhetsförbund (UNF) is a Swedish youth temperance organisation, founded in 1970 after a merging between Sveriges Godtemplares Ungdomsförbund (SGU) and Heimdal. It is the youth organization of the IOGT-NTO movement. It is a member of the European umbrella organisation ACTIVE and the Nordic umbrella organisation NORDGU. UNF has about 7000 members. The current heads of the organisation are Jane Segerblom and Filip Nyman.

External links
Official website

Alcohol in Sweden
Temperance organizations